The Collins Nunatak is a small and isolated Nunatak on the Ingrid Christensen Coast of the Princess Elisabeth land in East Arctic. It rises about halfway between the Landing Bluff and the Statler Hills.

The Norwegian cartographers named and mapped the area in 1946 using aerial photographs from the Lars Christensen Expedition in 1936/37. New mapping was carried out in 1968 during tellurometer measurements as part of the Australian National Antarctic Research Expeditions. The Australian Antarctic Names and Medals Committee named it in 1968 after Neville Joseph Collins, diesel engine mechanic at Mawson Station (1957, 1960) and Wilkes Station, and was involved in the exploration of the Amery Ice Shelf in 1968.

External links 
 Collins Nunatak in Composite Gazetteer of Antarctica

Nunataks of Princess Elizabeth Land
Mountains of Antarctica
Ingrid Christensen Coast